Kansas City SmartPort is an economic development group for the existing logistics industry in Kansas City, Missouri and the attraction of logistics investments in the Kansas City metropolitan area. KC SmartPort is a non-profit, investor-based organization.

History
KC SmartPort was born out of the Mid-Continent TradeWay Study; an analysis to "determine the feasibility and national benefits of establishing the Kansas City region as a place where international trade processing activities can be carried out". The study was jointly commissioned in 1998 by the Mid-America Regional Council, the Greater Kansas City Chamber of Commerce, and the Kansas City Area Development Council.

International trade
The current proposal calls for officials from Mexico to inspect and tag cargo and before it is shipped via truck or train expedited through the international border to the Pacific deep water ports at Lázaro Cárdenas, Michoacán and Manzanillo, Colima, where the exports would be sent to Asia. It is claimed the port would be 15% cheaper than shipping exports to the California ports at San Diego and Los Angeles.

Initiatives
 Supply Chain Education Group
A coordinated effort to raise the awareness and understanding of what supply chain management is and its function in modern business practices.

 Kansas City has proposed two ports:
 The 14th & Liberty Street truck port near the city's first union train station in the city's West Bottoms (which is already in contract).
 The Richards-Gebaur train port south of the city which would be served by the Kansas City Southern Railroad (which is considered a long-term project).
 Proposed international collaboration in order to ship goods through Canada to Europe.

Logistical advantages of Kansas City
 Highest volume of rail traffic in the United States in terms of tonnage
 Third largest trucking center in the United States
 Largest free trade zone in the (more than 10,000 acres (40 km2)
 Largest underground warehouse space in the world, including SubTropolis
 Largest air cargo facility
 Largest navigable inland waterway
 Located in the center of NAFTA Railway and four major interstate highways (I-35, I-70, I-29, I-49)

Leadership and board of directors
Al Figuly, Chairman
Chris J. F. Gutierrez, President
Full Listing

References

External links
 Official website
 PDF

Economy of Kansas City, Missouri
Ports and harbors of Missouri
Kansas City metropolitan area
Metropolitan planning organizations
Local government in Kansas
Local government in Missouri
Councils of governments
Special economic zones of the United States